Salvatore Cantalupo (8 July 1959 – 13 August 2018) was an Italian actor.

Very active especially in the theater, Cantalupo became known to the general public and the media thanks to the 2008 film Gomorrah directed by Matteo Garrone and based on the novel by Roberto Saviano, in which Cantalupo played the role of Pasquale, a tailor who worked in high fashion, but gets exploited by the Camorra. He was also well known for the role of mayoral candidate Giovanni De Santis, rival of Cetto La Qualunque, in the satyrical film Qualunquemente.

He died on 13 August 2018, at the age of 59, after a short illness.

Partial filmography
 
Rehearsals for War (1998)
Gomorrah (2008)
Fort Apache Napoli (2009)
The White Space (2009
Bets and Wedding Dresses (2009)
Noi credevamo (2010)
Qualunquemente (2011)
Heavenly Body (2011)
Song'e Napule (2013)
See You Tomorrow (2013)
Leopardi (2014)
Perez. (2014)
Per amor vostro (2015)
Tenderness (2017)

References

External links
 
 

1959 births
2018 deaths
Italian male film actors
20th-century Italian male actors
21st-century Italian male actors
Male actors from Naples